Sundhultsbrunn is a locality situated in Aneby Municipality, Jönköping County, Sweden with 311 inhabitants in 2010.

References 

Populated places in Jönköping County
Populated places in Aneby Municipality